Sophia Andrea Mundy (born August 15, 1985) is an American soccer midfielder who last played for Atlanta Beat of Women's Professional Soccer.

References

External links
 Atlanta Beat player profile
 Boston Breakers player profile
 Boston Aztec player profile
 Portland player profile
 Houston player profile

1985 births
Living people
Women's association football midfielders
Soccer players from Houston
American expatriate sportspeople in Iceland
Boston Breakers players
Expatriate women's footballers in Iceland
Portland State Vikings women's soccer players
Houston Cougars women's soccer players
American women's soccer players
American expatriate women's soccer players
Sophia Mundy
Sophia Mundy
Sophia Mundy
Boston Aztec (WPSL) players
Women's Premier Soccer League players
Atlanta Beat (WPS) players
Women's Professional Soccer players